Dallas Weston (born 25 February 1971) is an Australian former professional rugby league footballer who played for the Parramatta Eels and the North Sydney Bears in the National Rugby League. Weston played as a  forward.

Playing career
Weston made his first grade debut for Parramatta against Penrith in Round 1 of the 1993 season.  In 1996, Weston joined Norths and played one season with the club before returning to Parramatta.  Weston was part of the 1998 Parramatta side which suffered preliminary final heartbreak to Canterbury.  After leading 18–2 with 10 minutes to go, Parramatta would go on to lose the game 32–20.  Weston played two more seasons for Parramatta before retiring at the end of the 2000 season.

References

1971 births
Living people
Australian rugby league players
Parramatta Eels players
Rugby league second-rows
New South Wales City Origin rugby league team players
North Sydney Bears players